The Passano Foundation, established in 1945, provides an annual award to a research scientist whose work – done in the United States – is thought to have immediate practical benefits. Many Passano laureates have subsequently won the Nobel Prize.

Selection of award winners

Passano Laureates 
 2022 Duojia Pan
 2021 Alfred Goldberg
 2020 David Eisenberg
 2019 Robert Fettiplace, James Hudspeth
 2018 Carl June, Michel Sadelain
 2017 Yuan Chang, Patrick S. Moore
 2016 , Helen Hobbs
 2015 James P. Allison (2018  Nobel Prize in Physiology or Medicine)
 2014 Jeffrey I. Gordon
 2013 Rudolf Jaenisch
 2012 Eric N. Olson
 2011 Elaine Fuchs
 2010 David Julius (2021  Nobel Prize in Physiology or Medicine)
 2009 Irving Weissman
 2008 Thomas Südhof (2013 Nobel Prize in Physiology or Medicine)
 2007 Joan Massagué Solé
 2006 Napoleone Ferrara
 2005 Jeffrey M. Friedman
 2003 Andrew Z. Fire (2006 Nobel Prize in Physiology or Medicine)
 2002 Alexander Rich
 2001 Seymour Benzer
 2000 Giuseppe Attardi, Douglas C. Wallace
 1999 Elizabeth Blackburn (2009 Nobel Prize in Physiology or Medicine), Carol W. Greider (2009 Nobel Prize in Physiology or Medicine)
 1998 H. Robert Horvitz (2002 Nobel Prize in Physiology or Medicine)
 1997 James E. Darnell, Jr.
 1996 Leland H. Hartwell (2001 Nobel Prize in Physiology or Medicine)
 1995 Robert G. Roeder, Robert Tjian
 1994 Bert Vogelstein
 1993 Jack L. Strominger, Don Craig Wiley
 1992 Charles Yanofsky
 1991 William S. Sly, Stuart Kornfeld
 1990 Alfred Goodman Gilman (1994 Nobel Prize in Physiology or Medicine)
 1989 Victor Almon McKusick
 1988 Edwin Gerhard Krebs (1992 Nobel Prize in Physiology or Medicine), Edmond Henri Fischer (1992 Nobel Prize in Physiology or Medicine)
 1987 Irwin Fridovich
 1986 Albert L. Lehninger, Eugene P. Kennedy
 1985 Howard Green
 1984 Peter Nowell
 1983 John Michael Bishop (1989 Nobel Prize in Physiology or Medicine), Harold Elliot Varmus (1989 Nobel Prize in Physiology or Medicine)
 1982 Roscoe O. Brady, Elizabeth F. Neufeld
 1981 Hugh McDevitt
 1980 Seymour S. Kety
 1979 Donald F. Steiner
 1978 Michael Stuart Brown (1985 Nobel Prize in Physiology or Medicine), Joseph L. Goldstein (1985 Nobel Prize in Physiology or Medicine)
 1977 Curt P. Richter
 1976 Roger Charles Louis Guillemin (1977 Nobel Prize in Physiology or Medicine)
 1975 Henry G. Kunkel
 1974 Seymour S. Cohen, Baruch Samuel Blumberg (1976 Nobel Prize in Physiology or Medicine)
 1973 Roger Sperry (1981 Nobel Prize in Physiology or Medicine)
 1972 Kimishige Ishizaka, Teruko Ishizaka
 1971 Stephen W. Kuffler
 1970 Paul Zamecnik
 1969 George Herbert Hitchings (1988 Nobel Prize in Physiology or Medicine)
 1968 
 1967 Irvine Page
 1966 John T. Edsall
 1965 Charles Brenton Huggins (1966 Nobel Prize in Physiology or Medicine)
 1964 Keith R. Porter, George Emil Palade (1974 Nobel Prize in Physiology or Medicine)
 1963 Horace Winchell Magoun
 1962 Albert Hewett Coons
 1961 Owen Harding Wangensteen
 1960 René Dubos
 1959 Stanhope Bayne-Jones
 1958 George W. Corner
 1957 
 1956 George Nicolas Papanicolaou
 1955 Vincent du Vigneaud (1955 Nobel Prize in Chemistry)
 1954 Homer Smith
 1953 John Franklin Enders (1954 Nobel Prize in Physiology or Medicine)
 1952 Herbert M. Evans
 1951 Philip Levine, Alexander Solomon Wiener
 1950 Edward Calvin Kendall (1950 Nobel Prize in Physiology or Medicine), Philip Showalter Hench (1950 Nobel Prize in Physiology or Medicine)
 1949 Oswald Avery
 1948 Alfred Blalock, Helen Brooke Taussig
 1947 Selman Abraham Waksman (1952 Nobel Prize in Physiology or Medicine)
 1946 Ernest W. Goodpasture
 1945 Edwin J. Cohn

Young Scientist Award 
 1992 Tom Curran
 1991 Roger Tsien (2008 Nobel Prize in Chemistry)
 1990 Matthew P. Scott
 1989 Louis M. Kunkel
 1988 Peter Walter
 1987 Jeremy Nathans
 1986 James Rothman (2013 Nobel Prize in Physiology or Medicine)
 1985 Mark M. Davis
 1984 Thomas R. Cech (1989 Nobel Prize in Chemistry)
 1983 Gerald M. Rubin, Allan C. Spradling
 1982 Roger D. Kornberg (2006 Nobel Prize in Chemistry)
 1981 William A. Catterall, Joel M. Moss
 1979 Richard Axel (2004 Nobel Prize in Physiology or Medicine)
 1978 Robert Lefkowitz (2012 Nobel Prize in Chemistry)
 1977 
 1976 
 1975 Joan A. Steitz

References

External links 
 Passano Foundation Home Page

Biomedical research foundations
Science and technology awards
Organizations established in 1945
Medical and health foundations in the United States